The 2012 United States Senate election in North Dakota took place on November 6, 2012, concurrently with the 2012 U.S. presidential election, other United States Senate elections, United States House of Representatives elections, and various state and local elections. Incumbent Democratic-NPL Senator Kent Conrad decided to retire instead of running for reelection to a fifth term.

Though each party endorses a single candidate in state conventions in the spring, ballot access for the general election was determined in a primary election held on June 12, 2012.

Heidi Heitkamp, a Democratic-NPL former North Dakota Attorney General, won the open seat over Republican Rick Berg, North Dakota's at-large U.S. Representative, by a margin of 0.9%. Heitkamp outperformed President Barack Obama by 20.5%, the latter having lost North Dakota by 19.6% in the concurrent presidential election. Heitkamp's very narrow winning margin made it the closest race of the 2012 United States Senate elections.

, this was the last time a Democrat was elected to Congress or won a statewide election in North Dakota.

Democratic-NPL primary 
The North Dakota Democratic-NPL Party held their state convention March 16–18, 2012, in Grand Forks. Former state attorney general and 2000 Democratic gubernatorial nominee Heidi Heitkamp was uncontested in seeking the official party nomination and was the only member of the party elected to appear on the state primary ballot.

Candidates

Declared 
 Heidi Heitkamp, former attorney general of North Dakota and nominee for Governor of North Dakota in 2000

Withdrew 
 Thomas Potter, Presbyterian pastor and former professor of finance at UND (dropped out February 2012)

Declined 
 Kent Conrad, incumbent U.S. Senator
 Pam Gulleson, former state representative and former chief of staff and former state director for former senator Byron Dorgan
 Kristin Hedger, nominee for North Dakota Secretary of State in 2006
 Joel Heitkamp, brother of Heidi Heitkamp, radio personality and former state senator
 Roger Johnson, president of the National Farmers Union and former North Dakota Agriculture Commissioner
 Tim Mathern, state senator and nominee for governor in 2008
 Earl Pomeroy, former U.S. Representative
 Tracy Potter, state senator and nominee for the U.S. Senate in 2010
 Tim Purdon, U.S. Attorney
 Jasper Schneider, USDA rural development State Director
 Mac Schneider, state senator
 Ryan Taylor, Minority Leader of the North Dakota Senate

Republican primary 
North Dakota Republicans endorsed U.S. Representative Rick Berg at their convention, though general election ballot access is determined by a statewide primary election held on June 12, 2012. In contrast to state political tradition, declared candidate Duane Sand did not seek the party endorsement, trying instead to defeat Berg on the June primary ballot.

Candidates

Declared 
 Rick Berg, U.S. Representative
 Duane Sand, former North and South Dakota Director for Americans for Prosperity and nominee for ND-AL in 2004 and 2008

Declined 
 Al Carlson, North Dakota state house majority leader
 Tony Clark, state public service commissioner
 Kevin Cramer, state public service commissioner
 Jack Dalrymple, North Dakota governor and 1992 Republican nominee for U.S. Senate
 Cory Fong, state tax commissioner
 Shane Goettle, U.S. Senator John Hoeven's state director
 Tony Grindberg, state senator
 Bob Harms, North Dakota Republican Party treasurer
 Brian Kalk, state public service commissioner (running for House)
 Kim Koppelman, state representative
 Ed Schafer, former U.S. agriculture secretary and former North Dakota governor
 Kelly Schmidt, North Dakota treasurer
 Wayne Stenehjem, North Dakota attorney general
 John Warford, mayor of Bismarck
 Drew Wrigley, North Dakota lieutenant governor

Endorsements

Polling

Results

General election

Candidates 
 Rick Berg (R), U.S. Representative
 Heidi Heitkamp (D), former attorney general of North Dakota and nominee for governor in 2000
 Bill Kiefer (I), businessman

Debates 
Complete video of debate, October 15, 2012 - C-SPAN
Complete video of debate, October 25, 2012 - C-SPAN

Fundraising

Top contributors

Top industries

Independent expenditures 
In early October 2012, Crossroads GPS announced that it would launch a $16 million advertising buy in national races, of which four were this and three other Senate elections.

Predictions

Polling

Results

See also 
 2012 United States Senate elections
 2012 United States House of Representatives election in North Dakota
 2012 North Dakota gubernatorial election

References

External links 
 North Dakota Secretary of State
 Campaign contributions at OpenSecrets
 Outside spending at Sunlight Foundation
 Candidate issue positions at On the Issues

Official campaign websites (Archived)
 Rick Berg for U.S. Senate
 Heidi Heitkamp for U.S. Senate

2012
North Dakota
United States Senate